The 2011 Open GDF Suez Nantes Atlantique was a professional tennis tournament played on hard courts. It was the ninth edition of the tournament which was part of the 2011 ITF Women's Circuit. It took place in Nantes, France between 31 October and 6 November 2011.

WTA entrants

Seeds

 1 Rankings are as of October 24, 2011.

Other entrants
The following players received wildcards into the singles main draw:
  Julie Coin
  Anaïs Laurendon
  Chloé Paquet
  Alice Tisset

The following players received entry from the qualifying draw:
  Séverine Beltrame
  Michaela Hončová
  Darija Jurak
  Magda Linette

Champions

Singles

 Alison Riske def.  Iryna Brémond, 6–1, 6–4

Doubles

 Stéphanie Foretz Gacon /  Kristina Mladenovic def.  Julie Coin /  Eva Hrdinová, 6–0, 6–4

External links
Official Website
ITF Search

Open GDF Suez Nantes Atlantique
Open GDF Suez Nantes Atlantique
2011